Huntly ( or Hunndaidh) is a town in Aberdeenshire, Scotland, formerly known as Milton of Strathbogie or simply Strathbogie. It had a population of 4,460 in 2004 and is the site of Huntly Castle. Its neighbouring settlements include Keith and Rothiemay. Both Huntly and the surrounding district of Gordon are named for a town and family that originated in the Border country.

Huntly is the historic home of the Gordon Highlanders regiment which traditionally recruited throughout the North-East of Scotland. Huntly has a primary school (Gordon Primary) and a secondary school (The Gordon Schools) beside Huntly Castle.

It is the home of the Deans bakers, which produce shortbread biscuits.  In November 2007, Deans of Huntly opened their new visitor centre.

Four of the owls from the local falconry centre starred in the Harry Potter films.

History

Settlement around the confluence of the Bogie and Deveron rivers dates back to the Neolithic period. Settlement remains and the remains of an Iron Age hillfort have been excavated on Battlehill on the outskirts of the town.  During the first millennium CE the area was dominated by the Pictish culture.  A very large Pictish settlement and vitrified hillfort was situated locally at Tap o' Noth in Strathbogie.

The site represented an important strategic site controlling routes from Moray into Strathdon and Deeside.  The first motte-and-bailey castle on this settlement was erected by Donchaid McDuff, the Gaelic speaking 2nd Mormaer of Fife, c.1180.  The lands were transferred to the Berwickshire Anglo-Norman family, the Gordons, in 1352 in retaliation for McDuff’s descendant, David of Strathbogie, defecting from Robert I to Edward I’s cause on the eve of the Battle of Bannockburn. 

The settlement at the confluence of the Bogie and the Deveron was known as Milton of Strathbogie or The Raws of Strathbogie until 1508.
 
Despite the boggy lands in the vicinity at that time, the castle at Strathbogie became a key centre for the Gordons of Moray over the following centuries as the family built power through warfare and dynastic marriage, rising to be the dominant family in the North-East of Scotland – the clan chief acquiring the informal title of Cock o' the North.  As a result, a thriving settlement serving the evolving palace complex developed. The settlement became a burgh of barony in 1472.
In 1508 the Gordons received a royal charter enabling them to rename Milton of Strathbogie & the castle to Huntly – the name of their ancestral seat in Berwickshire.

During the Scottish Reformation, the Gordons were among the leading Catholic families in the country and heavily embroiled in Mary, Queen of Scots’ conflict with the reformed church and the protestant magnates.  Huntly castle was bombarded and sacked in 1562 (by Mary) and in 1594 by James VI.

After the restoration of Gordon titles, the town continued to develop during the 17th and 18th centuries both as a market town and an adjunct to the Gordons’ palace with a wide range of merchants and artisans serving the surrounding countryside – in the mid-17th century the town hosted 4 separate glovers. 

The adjacent parishes of Dunbennan and Kinnoir were consolidated into a single parish of Huntly in 1727, though each of these livings had been in the gift of the Marquess of Huntly for centuries. During this century, the Duke of Gordon also commenced redeveloping the town as a planned-town with grid-iron streets.

The 18th centuries saw the development of the flax industry and associated cottage industries in heckling, spinning, bleaching and weaving, though the trade was inhibited in the longer term by poor transport infrastructure to Banff and Aberdeen. Smuggling whisky was also an important trade at this period until the industry was licensed in 1823.

In the 19th century, following the post-Napoleonic slump in the linen trade, the town experienced another period of growth with the establishment of rail transport in 1845 coupled with a shift from peasant farming to capitalist agriculture.  Huntly became an important market and shipping centre whilst its surrounding parishes depopulated.

In 1836 the town and the Gordon estates passed to the Sussex-based 5th Duke of Richmond by inheritance.  Ownership of the feu and much of the land and property remained in the ownership of the Dukes of Richmond and Gordon until August 1936 when all the property and feus in the town along with much surrounding farmland was sold at auction at Huntly Town Hall in order to pay death duties on the ducal estates.

Though the town’s population has varied slightly over the 20th century – with a net outward migration after the 2nd World War – the town in 2018 had a population of 4,650. This compares with 4,229 in 1911.  Significant demographic growth was over the course of the 19th century from 1000 in 1800 to 3,600 in 1861.

Arts
Huntly is home to Deveron Projects, an arts organisation that invites artists from all over the world to come and live and work in the town. Since 1995 it has worked with a 'town is the venue' methodology, connecting artists, communities and places. It hosts artists and projects that explore local, regional and global topics, such as forestry, geology, botany, foraging, anthropology, history, politics and art. Over 100 renowned artists have spent time in the town, including Roman Signer and Hamish Fulton.

Walking is often used as a medium to bring people together for these projects, and Deveron Projects has a Walking Institute that commissions artists to make walks. Their annual Slow Marathon started in 2012 in collaboration with Ethiopian artist Mihret Kebede. Deveron Projects also runs a community kitchen and gardening projects. In 2013 Deveron Projects won Huntly the Creative Place Award, which recognises 'creativity across Scotland’s smaller communities'.

Geography 
Brown Hill is located in Huntly parish.

Sports
There is salmon and trout fishing on the Rivers Deveron and Bogie, which are administered by the River Deveron Salmon Fisheries Board. Its other principal outdoor activities include golf, Nordic Skiing in Clashindarroch Forest, walking, mountain biking and Rugby. The local football team is Huntly F.C., the local rugby union side is Huntly RFC.

Transport 
Huntly railway station is a railway station serving the town. The station is managed by ScotRail and is on the Aberdeen to Inverness Line. The station opened on 20 September 1854.

Notable people 
 Ian Cameron, father of British Prime Minister, David Cameron, was from Glass, Huntly; he was born at Blairmore House.
 Ronald Center (1913–1973), composer, lived there from 1943 until his death in 1973, teaching first at the Gordon Schools, then privately.
 Willie Donald (1953–2022), first-class cricketer and former president of Cricket Scotland
 Iona Fyfe (born 1998), award-winning Scots singer and musician.
 Elizabeth Gordon, Duchess of Gordon (née Brodie; 1794 – 1864), was a Scottish noblewoman and church patron
 John Henderson (born 1973), a PDC darts player, is from Huntly.
 James Legge (1815–1897), scholar and missionary to China, was born in Huntly and educated there and at King's College Aberdeen, before leaving to his first mission post in Malacca in 1839. Across the next 43 years he worked in Hong Kong translating all the classic books of the Confucian canon in a huge series of books, a set still considered to be the gold standard of English translations today. He frequently returned to Huntly across his life in China, bringing three young Chinese lads to live there and get "a good Scottish education" in 1845. By the time they returned to China in 1848 they had all been invited to meet Queen Victoria, then a lively young woman. Legge retired from his mission work in Hong Kong in 1873, was named the first Oxford Professor of Chinese in 1876, and lived there until his death. His father Ebenezer Legge had been Mayor of Huntly, and the Legge family home is still in use, on the main square.
 George MacDonald (1824–1905), writer, and influence upon JRR Tolkien and CS Lewis. Some of his novels, especially the Robert Falconer and Alec Forbes of Howglen play partly in Huntly, even if the name of the town is changed, and give an introduction to the life in Huntly in the 19th century.
 William Milne (1785–1822), born at Kennethmont near Huntly, was the second British Protestant missionary to China (following Robert Morrison).  He was the founding headmaster of the first Anglo-Chinese school, Ying Wa College, in 1818 at Malacca.  (This school was subsequently moved to Hong Kong by James Legge in 1843 and still exists.)
 George Philip, (1800–1882) was a cartographer, map publisher and founder of the publishing house George Philip & Son Ltd. He was born in Huntly. 
 John Perie (1831–1874) VC, born in Huntly.
 Jo Pitt, para-equestrian (1979-2013), was from Huntly.
 Andrew Young, (born 1992) cross-country skier with several world cup podiums.
 William Mellis Christie (1829–1900), founder of the Canadian Mr. Christie brand of cookies and biscuits.

References

External links 
Experience Huntly website
Gazetteer of Scotland (1836) entry for Huntly, accessed 28 December 2011
Gazetteer of Scotland (1882-5) entry for Huntly, accessed 28 December 2011
Gordon Primary
The Gordon Schools

 
Towns in Aberdeenshire